We Are Young & Free is the first album in the Hillsong Young & Free series by Australian CCM Hillsong Music Australia.

The album was preceded by the releasing of two singles "Alive" and "Wake", and a Spanish single "Vivo Estás". The album was recorded live at the Hillsong Convention Centre on 19 April 2013.

History 
The album was announced in an official page of the band by a series of photos. On 22 March 2013, during the Colour Conference, the release date was set to be October later that year. On 10 April, the band started the publicity for the album recording night, by posting pictures about the event on Facebook, Twitter and other social networks.

Track listing

Charts

References 

2013 live albums
Hillsong Young & Free albums
Sparrow Records live albums